DeepCool is a computer hardware manufacturer headquartered in Beijing, China. Founded in 1996, the company produces a range of products including air and water CPU coolers, computer cases, power supplies, computer peripherals, and accessories. DeepCool has a manufacturing facility in Shenzhen, and branch offices in the United States, Europe, and other Asian countries. The company name was inspired by the IBM supercomputer Deep Blue.

History 
DeepCool was founded in Beijing, China, in 1996. The company opened its first manufacturing facility in January 2000 for component production, testing, and assembly.

On January 11, 2020, DeepCool released a new brand identity.

Products 

The company's products include: 
air and liquid CPU coolers
computer cases
computer fans
power supplies
computer peripherals
computer accessories

See also 
Arctic
Cooler Master
PCCooler
Thermaltake
Thermalright
Zalman

References

External links 
DeepCool official website

Computer hardware cooling
Computer hardware companies
Computer companies of China
Chinese brands
Computer enclosure companies
Computer power supply unit manufacturers